Kenny Brown (born July 5, 1953 on the Air Force base in Selma, Alabama) is an American blues slide guitarist skilled in the North Mississippi Hill Country blues style.

Brown apprenticed with Mississippi Joe Callicott, who was his neighbor in Nesbit, Mississippi, from age 12 to 15, when Callicott died. He had heard Othar Turner and others in nearby Como picnics, and cited Junior Kimbrough, Johnny Winter, and Johnny Shines as influences.

Around 1971, beside working in construction, Brown began playing with two other musicians. Johnny Woods would make an occasional playing partner to his death in 1990. More steady was Brown's learning with R. L. Burnside, who claimed Brown as his "adopted son," and affectionately called him "white boy on guitar" and "my white son." Brown has noted that they had trouble to book dates, when European event organizers would hear he is a white musician playing the traditionally African American blues, and that American record producers and critics have similar reservations.

Still in the early seventies they started to perform in their region, and would keep up as a duo for twenty years. Cedric Burnside joined their tours from about 1994, as Burnside's reputation surged. In the 1990s and early 2000s Brown participated in most of Burnside's tours and recordings, including the Burnside-Jon Spencer Blues Explosion collaborations and the remixed albums.

Brown first appeared abroad in Sweden in 1989, and later in the 1992 Åmåls Blues Fest with George "Mojo" Buford.

On record, he plays second guitar on two of Junior Kimbrough's albums throughout, and on some tracks on the posthumous compilation, God Knows I Tried. He is on tracks by Asie Payton, CeDell Davis and Paul "Wine" Jones, as well as Frank Frost and Cyndi Lauper.

Brown's own debut album was Goin' Back to Mississippi (1996), produced by Dale Hawkins. He has recorded one album for Fat Possum Records, Stingray (2003). He released Cheap, Fast, and Dirty (2006) with Danish guitarist Troels Jensen, at Olufsen Records. Meet Ya In The Bottom (2008) is a CD Baby release. His double album Can't Stay Long (2011)  was released on Devil Down Records.

In their 2003 tour he has opened for Widespread Panic (and the extended combo  Smiling assassins), as he earlier had with Burnside,

Brown's guitar work was featured in the 2006 film Black Snake Moan, where he provided backing for star Samuel L. Jackson's vocals. He can be seen in the film's climax as a guitarist in a blues band, playing alongside Cedric Burnside.

Brown's slide guitar is featured prominently in the Black Keys' 2021 album Delta Kream. Gary Walker in his review in Guitar describes Brown's playing as "electrifying" and states that "it’s worth the price of admission for Brown’s scorching slide solo alone." Brown along with bassist Eric Deaton joined the Black Keys' 2022 tour to promote Dropout Boogie, joining the band on stage to perform songs from Delta Kream.  Brown (along with Deaton and the Black Key's Dan Auerbach) also collaborated with Robert Finley in the 2021 album Sharecropper's Son. 

Brown lives in Potts Camp, Mississippi, in the North Mississippi Hill Country with his wife Sara.

Films
You See Me Laughin': The Last of the Hill Country Bluesmen (2003; released by Fat Possum Records in 2005). Produced and directed by Mandy Stein. Oxford, Mississippi: Plain Jane Productions, Inc; Fat Possum Records.

References

External links
 Kenny Brown at ReverbNation
 Kenny Brown page from Fat Possum Records site
 
 
 Extended discography at CD Universe

1953 births
Living people
American blues guitarists
American male guitarists
People from Nesbit, Mississippi
Fat Possum Records artists
Blues musicians from Mississippi
Musicians from Selma, Alabama
Guitarists from Mississippi
People from Marshall County, Mississippi
20th-century American guitarists
20th-century American male musicians